The 2011 Six Nations Under 20s Championship was a rugby union competition held between February and March 2011. England won the tournament along with the Grand Slam and the Triple Crown.

Final table

Results

Round one

Round two

Round three

Round four

Round five

References

2011
2011 rugby union tournaments for national teams
2010–11 in English rugby union
2010–11 in French rugby union
2010–11 in Irish rugby union
2010–11 in Welsh rugby union
2010–11 in Scottish rugby union
2010–11 in Italian rugby union
U-20
February 2011 sports events in Europe
March 2011 sports events in Europe